Center for Technology in Government is a research institution in University at Albany in Albany, New York, that focuses on the development of innovative solutions to help government provide better public services through technology. Through applied research and partnerships (e.g. with the Major Cities of Europe IT Users Group), projects are undertaken that address the policy, management, and technology dimensions of information use in the public sector.

Mission 
The Center for Technology in Government works with government to develop information strategies that foster innovation and enhance the quality and coordination of public services. 
We carry out this mission through applied research and partnership projects that address the policy, management, and technology dimensions of information use in the public sector. 
The results generated by each project add to a growing knowledge base designed to support the work of both government professionals and academic researchers. Our guides, reports, and tools are freely available on the Center's Publications page.

Research Area 
CTG's research areas include information sharing between government organizations. Researchers at CTG have conducted major studies on this topic about which little theoretical research has been conducted outside of Geographic Information System (GIS) area (Rocheleau, 2006, p. 310). Examples include their studies on knowledge networks in public sector (Dawes, Cresswell, & Pardo, 2009) and the framework for information sharing between state and local governments (Dawes et al., 1997).

Awards 
Since 1993, CTG has earned recognition from state and national organizations for both its organizational accomplishments, scholarly papers, and the individual expertise and service of its staff. The Center have received honors such as Ford Foundation's Innovations in American Government award and Governing magazine’s Public Official of the Year award. The specific list of the 24 awards, including organizational awards, project awards, best paper awards, and individual and University awards is on the center's Web site:

References 
 Dawes, S. S., Pardo, T. A., Green, D. E., McInemey, C. R., Connelly, D. R., and DiCaterino, A. (1997). Tying a sensible knot: A practical guide to state-local information systems. Albany, NY: Center for Technology in Government.
 Rocheleau, B. A. (2006). Public Management Information Systems. Hershey, PA: Idea Group.
 Dawes, S. S., Cresswell, A. M., and Pardo, T. A. (2009). From ‘‘need to know’’ to ‘‘need to share’’: Tangled problems, information boundaries, and the building of public sector knowledge networks. Public Administration Review, 69(3), 392-402.

Notes

External links 
Center for Technology in Government official Web site

Research institutes in New York (state)
University at Albany, SUNY